Tajik National Park is a national park and nature reserve in eastern Tajikistan. It was established in 1992 and expanded in 2001 to include parts of the Pamir Mountains.

History

From 1989 to 1992, Anvar J. Buzurukov (as the head of the Protected Areas Department of the Ministry of the Environment) initiated, planned and led (under the international scientific camp "Pamir-90") scientific feasibility studies towards establishing the first national and natural parks in the Tajik Soviet Socialist Republic. A year later the same team established the first nature reserve in Tajikistan, Shirkent Nature Park.

Ecology and wildlife
The national park features a mix of steppe, desert, grassland and alpine regions. It has long cold winters and cool summers, with an average annual rainfall of 12.7 cm.

Species known to live in the national park include the brown bear, snow leopard, wolves, markhor, Marco Polo sheep, brown-headed gulls and bar-headed geese.

World Heritage status
In 2008, the national park was submitted to UNESCO with a view to becoming a World Heritage Site. In 2013, the park was accepted as World Heritage.

References

National parks of Tajikistan
World Heritage Sites in Tajikistan